The High Commissioner of Australia to Ghana is an officer of the Australian Department of Foreign Affairs and Trade and the head of the High Commission of the Commonwealth of Australia in Accra, Ghana. The position has the rank and status of an Ambassador Extraordinary and Plenipotentiary and is currently held by Berenice Owen-Jones since 6 July 2022. The ambassador also holds non-resident accreditation as High Commissioner to Sierra Leone (1981–1985, since 2004), and Togo (since 2009), and as ambassador to Burkina Faso (since 2008), Côte d'Ivoire (1974–1985, since 2004), Mali (since 2004), Senegal (1974–1985, since 2004), Liberia (since 2008), and Guinea (since 2008). Non-resident accreditation as high commissioner to The Gambia was also held from 1982 to 1985, and from 2004 to 2008. Australia maintained a High Commission in Accra from 1957 to 1985, at which point accreditation was held by the High Commissioner in Nigeria. The High Commission was re-established in 2004.

Posting history
Australia was one of the first countries to recognise Ghana on its independence from 6 March 1957. The Australian Government sent Frederick Osborne, the Minister for Air, and Keith Brennan from the Department of External Affairs, as well as three RAAF Lockheed P-2 Neptune aircraft, to attend and participate in the independence celebrations from 2–10 March. On 27 August 1957, the Minister for External Affairs, Richard Casey, announced the establishment of an Australian High Commission in Accra. On 16 October 1957, Stewart Wolfe Jamieson was announced as the first high commissioner, who assumed duty on 21 February 1958 based in the Ambassador Hotel Accra.

On 19 August 1974, the Minister for Foreign Affairs, Don Willesee, announced the appointment of the high commissioner in Ghana, David Evans, as Australia's first ambassador to Senegal and Ivory Coast, marking the establishment of diplomatic relations with these countries. In October 1981, the high commissioner received non-resident accreditation as the first high commissioner to Sierra Leone. In February 1982, high commissioner Anthony Dingle, presented his commission as Australia's first high commissioner to The Gambia. However, in March 1985 the Foreign Minister, Bill Hayden, announced that due to budgetary pressures and as part of a rearrangement of Australian diplomatic representation in Africa, the high commission in Accra would be closed, with accreditation transferred to High Commission in Nigeria. On his decision, Hayden noted the following to the Australian Parliament's Joint Committee on Foreign Affairs and Defence: "The decision to close the High Commission in Accra was not easy. Australia values its good relationship with Ghana and has no wish to give the impression that it is not concerned with or interested in the issues of the area. I have assured the Ghanaian Government that Australia looks forward to maintaining close relations through the accreditation of a non-resident High Commissioner."

On 30 June 2004, Foreign Minister Alexander Downer announced the official reopening of the Australian High Commission in Accra, with non-resident accreditation for Cote d'Ivoire, The Gambia, Senegal and Sierra Leone being transferred from the High Commission in Nigeria. In September 2008 the governments of Australia and Liberia agreed to establish diplomatic relations at the ambassador level, with high commissioner Billy Williams becoming Australia's first Ambassador to Liberia from February 2009.

Heads of mission

Notes
: Also non-resident Ambassador to Côte d'Ivoire, 1974–1985 and 2004–present.
: Also non-resident Ambassador to Senegal, 1974–1985 and 2004–present.
: Also non-resident High Commissioner to Sierra Leone, 1981–1985 and 2004–present.
: Also non-resident High Commissioner to The Gambia, 1982–1985, 2004–2008.
: Also non-resident Ambassador to Mali, 2004–present.
: Also non-resident Ambassador (2009–2022) and High Commissioner (2022–present) to Togo.
: Also non-resident Ambassador to Burkina Faso, 2008–present.
: Also non-resident Ambassador to Liberia, 2008–present.
: Also non-resident Ambassador to Guinea, 2008–present.

References

External links

Australian High Commission, Ghana – Burkina Faso, Côte d'Ivoire, Guinea, Liberia, Mali, Senegal, Sierra Leone, Togo

Australia and the Commonwealth of Nations
Ghana and the Commonwealth of Nations
Ghana
 
 
 
 
Australia